Barlow Branch is a  long tributary to Blackbird Creek in New Castle County, Delaware.  Barlow Branch is one of the major tributaries to Blackbird Creek above tidal influence.

Course
Barlow Branch rises on the Sassafras River divide just north of Ebenezer Church, Delaware.

Watershed
Barlow Branch drains  of area, receives about 43.6 in/year of precipitation, has a topographic wetness index of 602.79 and is about 22.5% forested.

See also
List of Delaware rivers

Maps

References

Rivers of Delaware
Rivers of New Castle County, Delaware
Tributaries of Delaware Bay